

Major professional teams

National Basketball Association (NBA)

Active teams

Defunct teams

Basketball Association of America

Defunct teams

Minor professional teams

Active leagues

American Basketball Association

Defunct teams

Canadian Elite Basketball League

Active teams

National Basketball League of Canada

Active teams

Defunct teams

NBA G League

Active teams

Defunct leagues

Continental Basketball Association

International Basketball Association

International Basketball League

National Basketball League (1993–94)

Ontario Professional Basketball Association

Pacific Coast Professional Basketball League

Premier Basketball League

World Basketball League

University teams

U Sports

Active teams

Atlantic University Sport

Canada West Universities Athletic Association

Ontario University Athletics

Réseau du sport étudiant du Québec

Defunct teams

National Association of Intercollegiate Athletics

Defunct teams

National Collegiate Athletic Association

Active team

Great Northwest Athletic Conference

 
Basketball